The Consulate-General of Japan in Saint Petersburg is the consulate of Japan in Saint Petersburg, Russia. It is located at 29 Nabereznaya Reki Moiki in the Tsentralny district of Saint Petersburg.

The building was constructed in 1851 for Aleksey Lobanov-Rostovsky, with reconstructions and extensions in 1868 and 1875.

The decision to open a consulate-general in Leningrad, as it was then named, was taken by the Japanese cabinet following a bill passed in the Diet.  This happened on 30 March, 1971 with effect from April 1.  This was part of a consular agreement in which consulates were also opened in Osaka, Sapporo and Nakhodka.

See also 
 Japan–Russia relations
 Diplomatic missions in Russia

References

External links 

  Consulate-General of Japan in Saint Petersburg
  

Japan–Russia relations
Japan
Saint Petersburg
Houses completed in 1875
Japan–Soviet Union relations